Joshua Walter Kimmich (born 8 February 1995) is a German professional footballer who plays as a defensive midfielder or right-back for  club Bayern Munich and the Germany national team. Often considered as one of the best midfielders in the world, he is known for his versatility, aggression, and playmaking ability. He is often compared with former Bayern Munich captain Philipp Lahm and is considered his successor.

After coming through RB Leipzig's youth academy, Kimmich began playing for the club' first team in 2013. Two years later, he joined Bayern Munich. In the 2019–20 season, after winning the continental treble with Bayern Munich, Kimmich was included in the UEFA Team of the Year, the FIFA FIFPro Men's World11, and was recognized as the UEFA Champions League Defender of the Season.

Widely considered one of the best midfielders of this generation, José Mourinho lauded him calling him a phenomenon, and was also highly praised by many coaches and pundits like Pep Guardiola.

Club career

Early career
Kimmich played youth football for VfB Stuttgart.

He then went on to join RB Leipzig in July 2013. Stuttgart secured an option to rebuy. He made his 3. Liga debut for the club on 28 September of that year, as a substitute for Thiago Rockenbach in a 2–2 draw with SpVgg Unterhaching. He scored his first professional goal in a 3–2 victory over 1. FC Saarbrücken on 30 November 2013. He finished the 2013–14 season with one goal in 26 appearances.

Kimmich scored his first goal of the 2014–15 season in a 3–2 victory against Union Berlin on 1 March 2015. He finished the 2014–15 season with two goals in 29 appearances.

Kimmich left the club with a tally of three goals in 53 league appearances for the club.

Bayern Munich

2015–17
On 2 January 2015, Kimmich agreed to join Bayern Munich on a five-year contract lasting until 30 June 2020, for a reported fee of €7 million, most of which went to VfB Stuttgart. He made his debut for the club on 9 August, starting in the first round of the DFB-Pokal against FC Nöttingen. Pep Guardiola gave him his Bundesliga debut the following month on 12 September when he entered play as a late substitute at home against FC Augsburg. Four days later, Kimmich made his first appearance in the UEFA Champions League in Bayern's tournament opener away at Olympiakos and he started in the Bundesliga for the first time three days thereafter, playing 90 minutes against SV Darmstadt 98 in a 3–0 victory.

Kimmich ended his first season at Bayern having made 23 league appearances of which 15 were starts. He also played the full 120 minutes in Bayern's 2016 DFB-Pokal Final defeat of Borussia Dortmund at the Berlin Olympiastadion on 21 May.

Kimmich started the 2016–17 season by coming on as a substitute in a 2–0 win against Borussia Dortmund in the 2016 DFL-Supercup. On 9 September, he scored his first goal for FC Bayern in a 2–0 Bundesliga, away win at FC Schalke 04. Four days later, he scored his first two Champions League goals in a 5–0 home win against FC Rostov. Kimmich scored a late winning goal in the 88th minute in a 1–0 away victory over Hamburger SV. He finished the 2016–17 season with nine goals in forty appearances.

2017–20
Kimmich played in the 2017 DFL-Supercup and won the title as Bayern defeated their arch-rival Borussia Dortmund on 5–4 penalties after the extra time ended 2–2. On 16 September, he provided overall three assists to Thomas Müller, Arjen Robben and Robert Lewandowski's goals to defeat 1. FSV Mainz 05 with a 4–0 victory. On 9 March 2018, Kimmich signed a three-year contract extension which lasts until 30 June 2023. He managed to score each goal in both the first and second leg in the Champions League semi-final tie against Real Madrid, but his side were knocked out from the competition on 4–3 aggregate. Kimmich finished the 2017–18 season with six goals and seventeen assists in 47 appearances.

On 12 August, Kimmich started the 2018–19 season by playing in the German Super Cup and also won the title as his side defeated Eintracht Frankfurt with a 5–0 victory. The following week, on 18 August 2018, Kimmich played in the 1–0 win against SV Drochtersen/Assel in the first round of the German Cup. Kimmich played in the opening match of the Bundesliga season against 1899 Hoffenheim on 24 August 2018. Bayern won the match 3–1. Kimmich's first goal of the season came against Hannover 96 on 15 December 2018. He made his 100th league appearance for the club on 9 February 2019 during a 3–1 win over rivals, Schalke.

Kimmich played every single minute in all 34 matches in the Bundesliga. In those 34 matches, Kimmich scored two goals and finished second in the league with 13 assists. On 14 August 2020, Kimmich scored one goal and provided an assist in an 8–2 win over Barcelona in the 2019–20 UEFA Champions League quarter-final. On 23 August 2020, Kimmich made an important assist for the winning goal against Paris Saint-Germain by Kingsley Coman in the final, to be his first Champions League title along with his teammate Serge Gnabry, another VfB Stuttgart academy product.

2020–23

Kimmich started the 2020–21 season by acquiring the number 6 shirt, after Thiago Alcântara, who had worn it for seven years, departed for Liverpool. On 30 September 2020, he scored the winning goal in a 3–2 win over Borussia Dortmund in the 2020 DFL-Supercup. On 27 October, Kimmich scored the winning goal in a 2–1 away victory over Lokomotiv Moscow in the 2020–21 UEFA Champions League.

On 23 August 2021, Kimmich signed a new contract with Bayern, keeping him at the club until 2025. On 24 January 2023, he scored a goal from a distance of 25 meters, to equalize the match 1–1 against 1. FC Köln in the 90th minute.

International career

On 17 May 2016, Kimmich was named in Germany's preliminary 27-man squad for UEFA Euro 2016. On 31 May 2016, he was named in the final 23-man squad and given the shirt number 21. On 21 June 2016, Kimmich was selected to start for Germany in their final Group C match against Northern Ireland, replacing Benedikt Höwedes at right-back. Kimmich remained Germany's first-choice right-back as they reached the semi-finals and was named in UEFA's Team of the Tournament.

On 4 September 2016, Kimmich scored his first goal for the German national team in a 3–0 victory over Norway during 2018 FIFA World Cup qualification.

On 17 May 2017, Kimmich was included in Joachim Löw's Germany squad for the 2017 FIFA Confederations Cup. He started in all five of the team's matches at the tournament, registering two assists, as Germany won its first Confederations Cup title.

On 6 June 2017, Kimmich scored from a stunning overhead kick in a friendly against Denmark in the 88th minute of the game which helped Germany to grab their late equaliser against Denmark, as the match ended up 1–1.

On 4 June 2018, Kimmich was selected for Germany's final 23-man squad by Joachim Löw for the 2018 FIFA World Cup. On 17 June 2018, Kimmich made his World Cup debut against Mexico in their opening match, but the game ended in a 1–0 loss for Germany.

On 6 September 2018, Kimmich started Germany's UEFA Nations League opener against France, playing as a defensive midfielder for the first time in 18 months.

On 19 May 2021, he was selected to the squad for the UEFA Euro 2020.

On 4 June 2022, he played the entire 90 minutes in a 1–1 draw against Italy in a group game in the 2022–23 UEFA Nations League and scored a goal in the process. Ten days later, he scored a goal in a 5–2 win against the same opponent.

On 10 November 2022, he was named in the 26-man squad for the 2022 FIFA World Cup in Qatar.

Style of play

Horst Hrubesch has praised Kimmich for his versatility, saying "Joshua has enormous quality and is versatile in both attacking and defensive roles," also describing him as "an intelligent player with good technical skills and agility" and as "a winner." Remarking on Kimmich's versatility, a 2017 article on the Bundesliga's official website referred to him as a "veritable Swiss Army knife of a player", citing Guardiola's conversion of a player he once referred to as "one of the best defensive midfielder in the world" into a right-back. He has also been used as a make-shift centre-back on occasion, as a central midfielder, or even as a deep-lying playmaker, due to his ability to dictate play in midfield. In 2015, Guardiola described Kimmich as a promising player, and noted that he "...has everything a player needs. He is very intelligent, always aggressive toward the ball, strong in the air, has an eye for free space, has superb vision and knows when to charge forward and when to sit back."

Amin Younes complimented Kimmich's defensive awareness as well in an interview, after the U21 EURO group stage. "Winning the ball back superbly. He does that really well", Younes told to the media. During the U21 competition, Philip Röber of UEFA.com, described Kimmich's playing style on the website and compared him to İlkay Gündoğan, but other critics compared him to retired Bayern captain Philipp Lahm.At Leipzig, he was part of an extremely attack-minded team in which his ball-winning qualities in front of a high back four shone through. In the Germany U21 side, he has a deeper role, but he has also caught the eye as a tidy defensive midfielder. Kimmich has great timing in his tackles, can dribble and does not mind putting in the legwork.

Being comfortable in possession, Kimmich is also known for his precise passing and crossing, and is a good striker of the ball. Kimmich himself has cited Bastian Schweinsteiger, Xabi Alonso, and Xavi as some of his inspirations.

Personal life
Kimmich has two children, a son, born in 2019, and a daughter, born in October 2020, with his girlfriend Lina Meyer.

Outside football
Kimmich launched an online initiative "We Kick Corona" with his Bayern Munich teammate Leon Goretzka, to help charitable, social or medical institutions during the COVID-19 pandemic. Despite his early support for that initiative, he has remained unvaccinated against COVID. His unvaccinated status caused him to miss important matches for both the German national team and Bayern. After testing positive for COVID in November 2021 and reportedly experiencing multiple side effects including decreased lung capacity, Kimmich publicly stated that he regretted his hesitancy and stated he would be receiving the vaccination.

In March 2023, he featured in German crime series Tatort.

Career statistics

Club

International

Honours

Bayern Munich
 Bundesliga: 2015–16, 2016–17, 2017–18, 2018–19, 2019–20, 2020–21, 2021–22
 DFB-Pokal: 2015–16, 2018–19, 2019–20
 DFL-Supercup: 2016, 2017, 2018, 2020, 2021, 2022
 UEFA Champions League: 2019–20
 UEFA Super Cup: 2020
 FIFA Club World Cup: 2020

Germany U19
 UEFA European Under-19 Championship: 2014

Germany
 FIFA Confederations Cup: 2017

Individual
 Fritz Walter Medal U19 Bronze: 2014
 UEFA European Championship Team of the Tournament: 2016
 UEFA Champions League Breakthrough XI: 2016
 German national Player of the Year: 2017, 2021
 UEFA Champions League Squad of the Season: 2017–18, 2019–20
 UEFA Champions League Defender of the Season: 2019–20
 UEFA Team of the Year: 2020
 FIFA FIFPro World11: 2020
 FIFA Club World Cup Bronze Ball: 2020
 ESM Team of the Year: 2018–19
 Bundesliga Team of the Season: 2017–18, 2018–19, 2019–20, 2020–21, 2021–22
 kicker Bundesliga Team of the Season: 2018–19, 2019–20
 Bundesliga Goal of the Month: May 2020, September 2020
 IFFHS Men's World Team: 2020

References

External links

Profile at the FC Bayern Munich website

1995 births
Living people
People from Rottweil
Sportspeople from Freiburg (region)
Footballers from Baden-Württemberg
German footballers
Association football defenders
Association football midfielders
Association football utility players
VfB Stuttgart players
RB Leipzig players
FC Bayern Munich footballers
3. Liga players
2. Bundesliga players
Bundesliga players
UEFA Champions League winning players
Germany youth international footballers
Germany under-21 international footballers
Germany international footballers
UEFA Euro 2016 players
2017 FIFA Confederations Cup players
2018 FIFA World Cup players
UEFA Euro 2020 players
2022 FIFA World Cup players
FIFA Confederations Cup-winning players